Sarvodaya Jain temple is a Jain temple in Amarkantak town in Anuppur, Madhya Pradesh.

History 
The temple construction started under the guidance of Acharya Vidyasagar in 2006. Upon completion the height of the temple will be 151 feet, width 125 feet and length 490 feet. Bhairon Singh Shekhawat, the former Vice President of India, laid the foundation stone of the temple.

Architecture 
The temple, is being constructed using lime and preserved stones. The temple complex constructed without cement and iron. The mulnayak of the temple is a 24 tonne Ashtadhatu idol of Rishabhanatha seated on a 28 tonne lotus shaped Ashtadhatu pedestal. The Rishabhanatha idol is  sitting in Padmasan posture. A statue of Mahavira weighing 71 tonne is also installed here. The pink colored sandstone from Rajasthan has been used for construction.

Photo gallery

See also 
 Kundalpur

References

Citation

Sources

External links 
 

Jain temples in Madhya Pradesh
21st-century Jain temples
Anuppur district